Flying Officer George Searle Lomax Hayward  (1 November 1894 – 16 August 1924) was an English World War I aerial observer credited with 24 victories. He served as an observer/gunner for fellow aces Frank Weare, Ernest Elton, and William Lewis Wells. Hayward scored the bulk of his wins, 22 of them, between 6 March and 22 April 1918, usually scoring two or three times in the same fight.

World War I service
Hayward originally enlisted in the 3rd Hussars, becoming a lance corporal. On 28 September 1916 he was commissioned as a second lieutenant in the Royal West Kent Regiment. In late 1917 he transferred to the Royal Flying Corps, being appointed a flying officer (observer) on 6 December, with seniority from 23 October. Posted to No. 22 Squadron RFC, he scored twenty-four victories as an observer in the Bristol F.2 Fighter, between November 1917 and April 1918.

In July 1918 he was awarded the Military Cross. His citation read:
Temporary Second Lieutenant George Searle Lomax Hayward, Royal West Kent Regiment, attached Royal Flying Corps.
For conspicuous gallantry and devotion to duty. On three separate occasions when engaged with large hostile formations, he has attacked and sent crashing to earth two hostile machines on each occasion. He has displayed consistent skill, courage and determination in dealing with hostile aircraft.

Post-war  career
Hayward left the Royal Air Force on 17 May 1919, when he was transferred to the unemployed list. However, on 24 October 1919 he was granted a short-service commission in the RAF as an observer officer.

By early 1920 he was in India surveying the main civil air route between Delhi and Karachi. On 1 December 1923 Hayward, by now a Flying Officer, was posted to the RAF Depot, pending assignment, and on 1 March 1924 he was posted to No. 2 Flying Training School at RAF Duxford.

Death
No.2 FTS moved to RAF Digby, Lincolnshire, in June 1924. There, on 15 August, Hayward was instructing Pilot Officer Charles Victor Breakey in an Avro 504K, when their aircraft suffered an engine failure and plunged into the ground. Both men died later that day from their injuries.

References
Citations

Bibliography
 

1894 births
1924 deaths
People from Royal Tunbridge Wells
3rd The King's Own Hussars soldiers
Queen's Own Royal West Kent Regiment officers
Royal Flying Corps officers
Recipients of the Military Cross
British World War I flying aces
Royal Air Force personnel of World War I
Aviators killed in aviation accidents or incidents in England